Beniamino Stella (born 18 August 1941) is an Italian prelate of the Catholic Church who was Prefect of the Congregation for the Clergy from 2013 to 2021; he has been a cardinal since 2014. He began working in the diplomatic service of the Holy See in 1970, was made an archbishop in 1987, and served as a nuncio in several countries between 1987 to 2007. He led the Vatican's training program for its diplomats, the Pontifical Ecclesiastical Academy, from 2007 to 2013.

Early years
Beniamino Stella was born in Pieve di Soligo, Province of Treviso, Italy. After finishing secondary education, he entered the Pontifical Roman Seminary and studied philosophy and theology at the Pontifical Lateran University.

He was ordained a priest of the Diocese of Vittorio Veneto on 19 March 1966 by his uncle, Archbishop Costantino Stella of L'Aquila. That same year, to prepare for a diplomatic career he entered the Pontifical Ecclesiastical Academy. While there he also earned a degree in canon law from the Pontifical Lateran University.

Diplomatic service 
He joined the diplomatic service of the Holy See in 1970 and held posts in the nunciatures in the Dominican Republic from 1970 to 1973 and in Zaire as secretary from 1973 to 1976. He was made a chaplain of His Holiness on 5 September 1974. From 1976 to 1978, he served in the Second Section of the Secretariat of State; then in Malta as auditor. In 1978, after Malta's prime minister Dom Mintoff declared the nuncio,  Antonio del Giudice persona non grata, Stella headed the nunciature as chargé d'affaires. In 1983, he was assigned to the Council for the Public Affairs of the Church. He was assigned the rank of nunciature counselor on 1 February 1983.

On 21 August 1987, Pope John Paul II appointed Stella titular archbishop of Midila as well as  Apostolic Pro-Nuncio to the Republic of the Congo and Apostolic Delegate to Chad. Stella received his episcopal consecration from the Pope on 5 September. On 15 December 1992, he was named Apostolic Nuncio to Cuba. On 11 February 1999, he was appointed Apostolic Nuncio to Colombia.

On 13 October 2007 Pope Benedict XVI appointed him President of the Pontifical Ecclesiastical Academy.

Congregation for the Clergy
Pope Francis nominated him Prefect of the Congregation for the Clergy on 21 September 2013. On 16 December 2013 he was appointed as a member of the Congregation for Bishops. 

In an interview on 27 February 2019, Stella revealed that, for approximately ten years, the Congregation of the Clergy had been responsible for matters concerning priests who violate their vows of celibacy. Regarding violation of the celibacy policy, Stella stated "In such cases there are, unfortunately, Bishops and Superiors who think that, after having provided economically for the children, or after having transferred the priest, the cleric could continue to exercise the ministry."

Pope Francis accepted Stella's resignation as prefect of the congregation on 11 June 2021 and appointed Lazarus You Heung-sik as his successor, with the proviso that Stella would stay on until You was able to move to Rome and take office. You took up his new post on 2 August.

Cardinal
In the consistory of 22 February 2014, he was created Cardinal-Deacon of Santi Cosma e Damiano.

On 10 March 2015, Pope Francis appointed Stella a member of the Pontifical Committee for International Eucharistic Congresses.

He was named a member of the Pontifical Commission for the Vatican City State on 11 June 2016, of the Secretariat for Communications on 13 July 2016, of the Congregation for Divine Worship and the Discipline of the Sacraments on 28 October 2016, of the Congregation for the Doctrine of the Faith on 22 November 2016, and of the Congregation for the Evangelization of Peoples on 4 October 2017.

On 1 May 2020, Stella was raised to the order of cardinal bishop and assigned the suburbicarian see title of Porto-Santa Rufina.

He has served as the postulator for the canonization cause of Pope John Paul I since 2016.

See also
Cardinals created by Francis

Notes

Sources

External links 

 
 

1941 births
20th-century Italian Roman Catholic titular archbishops
Apostolic Nuncios to the Republic of the Congo
Apostolic Nuncios to Chad
Apostolic Nuncios to Cuba
Apostolic Nuncios to Colombia
Cardinal-bishops of Porto
Cardinals created by Pope Francis
21st-century Italian cardinals
Living people
Members of the Congregation for Bishops
Members of the Congregation for Divine Worship and the Discipline of the Sacraments
Members of the Congregation for the Evangelization of Peoples
Prefects of the Congregation for the Clergy
Pontifical Ecclesiastical Academy alumni
Pontifical Lateran University alumni
Pontifical Roman Seminary alumni
Presidents of the Pontifical Ecclesiastical Academy
People from Pieve di Soligo